Tylopilus sordidus is a bolete fungus in the family Boletaceae. It was originally described in 1874 by Charles Christopher Frost as a species of Boletus. Alexander H. Smith and Harry Thiers transferred it to the genus Tylopilus in 1968. The brownish cap surface is initially tomentose to felt-like, but develops cracks in age. All parts of the mushrooms bruise dark blue to greenish when injured. The spore print is reddish brown; spores are smooth, roughly elliptical, and measure 10–14 by 4–6 µm. The bolete is found in North America, where it grows on the ground under oaks and conifers. Its edibility was recently unknown, but it is now considered inedible.

References

External links

sordidus
Inedible fungi
Fungi described in 1874
Fungi of North America